Akobo Heritage and Memorial University (AHMU) is a university in South Sudan.

Location
The university is located in the town of Akobo, in Akobo County, Eastern Bieh, in northeastern South Sudan, close to the International border with Ethiopia.

External links
  Location of Akobo At Google Maps

See also
 Akobo
 Akobo Airport
 Akobo County
 Jonglei
 Greater Upper Nile
 Education in South Sudan
 List of universities in South Sudan

References

Universities in South Sudan
Jonglei State
Greater Upper Nile